Cannady is a surname. Notable people with the surname include:

Beatrice Morrow Cannady (1890–1974), American civil rights advocate
Devin Cannady (born 1996), American basketball player
Jesse Cannady (1911–1981), American baseball player
John Cannady (1923–2002), American football player
Rev Cannady (1904–1981), American baseball player
Richard Cannady (born 1935), American politician
William T. Cannady (born 1937), American architect